West Sister Island or Te-joma-de is a small uninhabited island in the Andaman Archipelago, at the northern side of the Duncan Passage, about 6 km southeast of Passage Island and 18 km north of North Brother.

The island is pear-shaped, about 380 m long in the NE-SW direction and 340 m wide at the base.   It is mostly covered by forest, and has a rocky shore all around, except for a tiny beach at the NE tip. Its highest point is 71 m above sea level.

West Sister and the larger East Sister, located about 250 m to the northeast, comprise the group called The Sisters.  They belong to the Andaman and Nicobar Islands Territory of India.

References

Islands of the Andaman and Nicobar Islands
Uninhabited islands of India
Islands of India
Islands of the Bay of Bengal